The Ransom Water Tower is a former water tower in the LaSalle County, Illinois, village of Ransom. It was added to the U.S. National Register of Historic Places in 1990.

History
After a fire in the early 1890s the village of Ransom decided to construct a public waterworks with a central water tower. The first meetings were held in 1893 and 1894. After some controversy over the size of the tank and tower a 45,000–50,000 gallon tank was constructed atop a brick water tower in 1896. The tower served the village from its construction until July 19, 1990.

Design
The Ransom Water Tower is located atop a hill, what was the highest point in the then-center of town. Upon its construction, a 40 foot brick tower was topped with a  wooden water tank. The brick tower is a round, "barrel", tower. At its base it has a diameter of 29 feet 4 inches which tapers as the tower rises to a diameter of about 24 feet.

Historic significance
The tower is locally significant to the settlement of Ransom. It helped the village flourish after a devastating fire and attracted settlers and business growth to Ransom. The Ransom Water Tower was added to the U.S. National Register of Historic Places on November 2, 1990.

References

External links

1990 photograph, via Illinois Historic Preservation Agency
Property Information Report: Ransom Water Tower, Illinois Historic Preservation Agency

National Register of Historic Places in LaSalle County, Illinois
Water towers in Illinois
Infrastructure completed in 1896
Towers completed in 1896
Water towers on the National Register of Historic Places in Illinois